Wendy Jean Chamberlin (born 12 August 1948) is a veteran diplomat who has served in the United States Department of State and USAID, worked for the UN High Commissioner on Refugees (UNHCR), and served as President of the Middle East Institute until 2018.

Career

US Department of State 

 1975 – Foreign Service officer
 Various offices:
Office of Israel and Arab-Israeli Affairs
Acting Director of Regional Affairs
Director of Press and Public Affairs in the Near Eastern Affairs Bureau
 Special Assistant for South Asian Affairs to the Under Secretary for Political Affairs
 Staff worker for Deputy Secretary of State and Assistant Secretary of State for East Asian Affairs
 1993 – 1996 – Deputy Chief of Mission at the U.S. Embassy in Kuala Lumpur, Malaysia.
 1996 – 1999 – Ambassador to Laos (Lao People's Democratic Republic).
 1999 – July, 2001 – Principal Deputy Assistant Secretary in the Bureau for International Narcotics and Law Enforcement Affairs (INL)
 July 18, 2001 – June, 2002 – United States Ambassador to Pakistan.

USAID 

 December 2, 2002 – Appointed Assistant Administrator. Served as head of the USAID Asia and Near East Bureau.
 December 22, 2003 – Ends tenure with USAID to move to UNHCR.

UN High Commissioner on Refugees (UNHCR) 

 December 12, 2003 – Appointed as Deputy High Commissioner on Refugees by High Commissioner for Refugees Ruud Lubbers.
 January 19, 2004 – Officially welcomed as Deputy High Commissioner.
 February 24 – June 2, 2005 – Appointed as acting High Commissioner on the retirement of Ruud Lubbers. Served until the appointment of former Portuguese Prime Minister António Guterres.
 February 25, 2005 – Called for donations and humanitarian aid to prevent suffering in South Sudan.
 April 1–22, 2005 – Toured refugee camps in Sudan and Chad, where women expressed their fears of returning home. She urged Sudan to protect its own citizens.
 April 25, 2005 – Speaking from Geneva, she emphasized the need for funding and to bring security to the war-torn region of Darfur in Sudan.
 June 22, 2005 – Presented the Nansen Refugee Award to Marguerite "Maggie" Barankitse, known as the "Angel of Burundi."
 April 16–21, 2006 – Traveled to Pakistan to view earthquake survivors and Afghan refuge camps.
 December 18, 2006 – Visits refugee camps in Kenya where Somalis have fled both war and flooding.

Middle East Institute 
 March 1, 2007 – Assumes presidency of the Middle East Institute.

References

External links 
Biography – US State Department

Search Results for "Wendy Chamberlin" at UNHCR, sorted by date
The Political Graveyard

|-

|-

1948 births
Ambassadors of the United States to Laos
Ambassadors of the United States to Pakistan
American officials of the United Nations
American humanitarians
American women ambassadors
Boston University School of Education alumni
Living people
Northwestern University alumni
United States Foreign Service personnel
Women humanitarians